Sargocentron melanospilos, the blackbotch squirrelfish, is a species of squirrelfish in the genus of Sargocentron. It is found in the Indo-Pacific region in the Red Sea; Zanzibar, Tanzania; from Aldabra and Seychelles to the Marshall Islands and American Samoa; north to Taiwan, southern Japan and the Ogasawara Islands, and south to the southern Great Barrier Reef and the Chesterfield Islands. It is a relatively uncommon inhabitant of rocky reefs and coral-rich areas, and is usually seen solitary, but it also forms schools when in deeper water or oceanic areas.

References

melanospilos
Fish of the Pacific Ocean
Fish of the Indian Ocean
Taxa named by Pieter Bleeker